Daniel J. Amit  (May 5, 1938 – November 4, 2007) was an Israeli physicist and pacifist, who was one of the pioneers in the field of computational neuroscience. Amit, Hanoch Gutfreund and Haim Sompolinsky, in a set of papers referred to as the ASG papers, were the first to demonstrate the utility of statistical mechanics in neural network research and helped establish theoretical and computational neuroscience as a novel approach that brings into brain research unique powerful sets of concepts, models, and standards of rigour.

Early life
Daniel Amit was born on May 5, 1938 in Łódź, Poland, to a wealthy Jewish family. In March 1940, several months after the German occupation of Poland, his parents managed to slip out of the country, and traveling through Italy, Turkey, Greece and Lebanon, reached Tel Aviv in July of the same year. Daniel grew up in a middle class neighbourhood of central Tel Aviv, met his wife to be, Dahlia, in high school and married her two years later at the age of 18. In 1961, he received a BA is Physics at the Hebrew University of Jerusalem, then completed his MA in Physics at the Weizmann Institute of Science, after which he served for two years in the newly established computer unit of the Israeli Army.

Scientific career
Amit started his scientific activity in particle physics, obtaining a PhD from Brandeis University in 1963, under Eugene P. Gross. He was then active, in the 1970s, in statistical mechanics. In the 1980s he moved on to a more interdisciplinary research including neurosciences. He was a visiting scholar at the Institute for Advanced Study in 1982-83. He was professor at The Racah Institute of Physics of the Hebrew University in Jerusalem and professor of neural networks in the Department of Physics of the Sapienza University of Rome and was among the founders of the modern theory of neural networks.

Activism
Amit's involvement with progressive causes started with the protest movement against the Vietnam War that intensified in the mid 1960's on campuses across the United States. It was during this period that he was first exposed to the Palestinian issue and other aspects of leftwing politics and ideas. He was widely known for his engagement for peace, especially between Israel and the Palestinians.

Later life
Amit was naturalized as an Italian citizen in 1999. The last decade of his life saw him bitterly disappointed at the failure of the left to construct a real alternative to globalisation and the dominance of the US [reference needed].The disappointment weighed on him heavily and he took his life in his Jerusalem home on November 4, 2007.

Awards
 In 2007, he was awarded with the Rammal Award by Euroscience.

References

External links
 "Testimonianze contro il male": Article on La Rivista del Manifesto (in Italian)

1938 births
2007 deaths
20th-century Israeli physicists
Brandeis University alumni
Academic staff of the Hebrew University of Jerusalem
Institute for Advanced Study visiting scholars
Israeli Jews
Israeli emigrants to Italy
Israeli expatriates in the United States
Israeli pacifists
Jewish physicists
Polish emigrants to Mandatory Palestine
Academic staff of the Sapienza University of Rome